Neiba Ndang is a politician from Nagaland, India. He was the Speaker of Nagaland Legislative Assembly from 1993 to 1998. He was elected to the State Legislature representing Peren Constituency in 1993 and 1998 Assembly Election.

References 

Indian National Congress politicians from Nagaland
1954 births
Naga people
Living people
Nagaland MLAs 1993–1998
Nagaland MLAs 1998–2003
People from Peren district
Speakers of the Nagaland Legislative Assembly
Nagaland politicians